Dripchevo is a village in the municipality of Harmanli, in Haskovo Province, in southern Bulgaria. It is located on the southern slope of the Sakar Mountain.

References

Villages in Haskovo Province